Plant Biology is a peer-reviewed scientific journal of plant biology. The journal was originally established as Berichte der Deutschen Botanischen Gesellschaft in 1883, changed its name to Botanica Acta in 1988. In 1999, the journal renamed itself Plant Biology, and restarted the volume numbering.

Plant Biology is published by John Wiley & Sons on behalf of the German Society for Plant Sciences and the Royal Botanical Society of the Netherlands. The journal is currently edited by Heinz Rennenberg and J. T. M. Elzenga.

Abstracting and indexing
The journal is abstracted and indexed in the following bibliographic databases:

According to the Journal Citation Reports, the journal has a 2020 impact factor of 3.081, ranking it 72nd out of 235 journals in the category "Plant Sciences".

References

External links

Publications established in 1883
English-language journals
Biology journals
Wiley (publisher) academic journals
Bimonthly journals
Botany journals